Agdistis desertorum is a moth of the family Pterophoridae. It is found in Libya.

The wingspan is about 14 mm for males and females. Males are dark grey, while females are somewhat lighter. Adults have been recorded in August.

References

Moths described in 1999
Agdistinae
Endemic fauna of Libya
Moths of Africa